Diaea livens is a species of crab spider in the family Thomisidae. It is found in Southern and Central Europe, Turkey, Caucasus, Iran, and has been introduced into the United States.

References

External links

 

Thomisidae
Articles created by Qbugbot
Spiders described in 1876